Qaleh Now-e Hajji Musa (also Romanized as Qal‘eh Now-e Ḩājjī Mūsá, Qal‘eh Now-e Ḩājj Mūsá, Qal‘eh Now-e Ḩāj Mūsá, Qal‘eh Now-ye Ḩaj Mūsá, and Qal‘eh Now-ye Ḩa Mūsá) is a village in Aftab Rural District, Aftab District, Tehran County, Tehran Province, Iran. At the 2006 census, its population was 903, in 209 families.

References 

Populated places in Tehran County